Parsippany Christian School (PCS) was a private Christian school in Parsippany, New Jersey, United States. Parsippany Christian School was founded in 1970. Parsippany Christian School consists of pre-kindergarten though twelfth grades. The purpose of the school is to provide a sound academic education integrated with a Christian view of God and the world. Social activities, athletics, and discipline procedures are also governed by biblical principles. The school is a member of American Association of Christian Schools (AACS) and the Garden State Association of Christian Schools. The school closed in 2019.

As of the 2017–18 school year, the school had an enrollment of 109 students (plus 4 in PreK) and 14.3 classroom teachers (on an FTE basis), for a student–teacher ratio of 7.6:1. The school's student body was 35.8% (39) White, 33.0% (36) Black, 19.3% (21) Hispanic, 8.3% (9) Asian and 3.7% (4) two or more races.

Athletics
Parsippany Christian School offers basketball, soccer, and volleyball.

Academics
PCS uses three different sources in their teaching: Bob Jones Press, A Beka Book, and Saxon Math.

Starting in middle school, electives offered to the students these include art, band, chess, choir, and computer. The high school electives include advanced math, art, band, chess, chemistry, choir, home economics, physics, and yearbook.

References

External links

1970 establishments in New Jersey
Christian schools in New Jersey
Educational institutions established in 1970
Schools in the Garden State Association of Christian Schools
Morris Plains, New Jersey
Private elementary schools in New Jersey
Private high schools in Morris County, New Jersey
Private middle schools in New Jersey